Yuriy Stefanovych Potimkov (born 1 August 2002) is a Ukrainian professional footballer who plays as a defender for Metalist 1925 Kharkiv in the Ukrainian Premier League.

Career
Born in Kharkiv, Potimkov is a product of the local Metalist Kharkiv, Arsenal Kharkiv and Metalist 1925 Kharkiv youth sportive school systems.

He played for amateurs FC Avanhard Kharkiv in the championship of the Kharkiv Oblast, but in July 2021 Potimkov signed a contract with the Ukrainian Premier League side Metalist 1925 Kharkiv. He made his debut in the Ukrainian Premier League for Metalist 1925 as a second half-time substituted player in a losing away match against Veres Rivne on 22 November 2021.

References

External links 

2002 births
Living people
Footballers from Kharkiv
Ukrainian footballers
Association football defenders
FC Metalist 1925 Kharkiv players
Ukrainian Premier League players